Advocates of animal rights support the philosophy of animal rights. They believe that many or all sentient animals have moral worth that is independent of their utility for humans, and that their most basic interests—such as in avoiding suffering—should be afforded the same consideration as similar interests of human beings. They employ a variety of methods including direct action to oppose animal agriculture. Many animal rights advocates argue that non-human animals should be regarded as persons whose interests deserve legal protection.

Background
The animal rights movement emerged in the 19th century, focused largely on opposition to vivisection, and in the 1960s the modern movement sprang up in England around the Hunt Saboteurs Association. In the 1970s, the Australian and American philosophers, Peter Singer and Tom Regan, began to provide the movement with its philosophical foundations. Singer argued for animal liberation on the basis of utilitarianism, first in 1973 in The New York Review of Books and later in his Animal Liberation (1975), while Regan developed a deontological theory of animal rights in several papers from 1975 onwards, followed by The Case for Animal Rights (1983).

A distinction persists within the movement—based on the utilitarian/deontological divide—between those who seek incremental reform, a position known as animal protectionism, and those on the abolitionist side, who argue that reform that aims to regulate, rather than abolish, the property status of animals is counterproductive.

Historically speaking, it can be argued that the genesis of the animal rights movement was in India given the impact that both Buddhism and Jainism had on people in India and the neighbouring countries in Asia. The country with the largest number and highest percentage of vegetarians is India. Buddhism among the global religions is an animal rights religion par excellence. It has long subscribed to the belief that all life forms including that of non-human animals are sacred and deserving of respect, and extolls kindness and compassion as utmost virtues worthy of cultivation. Buddhism unreservedly embraces all living beings in its ethical cosmology without discrimination on grounds of species, race, or creed. Buddhist tenets—including the first precept, "Do not kill"—extend to both human and non-human sentient beings. The Buddha was so adamant and protective of the more vulnerable members of the moral community—namely the animals—that he declared that: "He who has laid aside the cudgel that injures any creature whether moving or still, who neither slays nor causes to be slain—him I call an Arya (Noble person)" (Dhammapada). The earliest reference to the idea of non-violence to animals (pashu-ahimsa), apparently in a moral sense, is in the Kapisthala Katha Samhita of the Yajurveda (KapS 31.11), a Hindu text written about the 8th century BCE. Several Hindu, Jain, and Buddhist texts appearing in the following centuries, including the Tamil moral texts of the Tirukkural and the Naladiyar, emphasize on ahimsa and moral vegetarianism, which is equated to today's veganism.

List
The following is a list of impactful animal rights advocates from all positions within the movement, from academics to activists.

See also
 Animal rights
 Animal welfare
 List of vegans
 List of vegetarians
 List of peace activists
 List of animal rights groups
 List of animal advocacy parties

References

Further reading

 Beauchamp, Tom and Frey, R.G. (eds.). The Oxford Handbook of Animal Ethics. Oxford University Press, 2011.
 Bekoff, Marc (ed.). The Encyclopedia of Animal Rights and Animal Welfare. Greenwood, 2009.
 Linzey, Andrew (ed.). Animal Encyclopedia. University of Princeton Press (forthcoming).
 Linzey, Andrew (ed.). The Global Guide to Animal Protection. University of Illinois Press (forthcoming).
 Animal Friendly Cultural Heritage and royal decrees in the legal history of Sri Lanka

Animal rights-related lists
Lists of activists
Lists of people by ideology